Cedar Heights is an census designated place in Prince George's County, Maryland, United States. Per the 2020 Census, the population was 1,597.

Demographics

2020 census

Note: the US Census treats Hispanic/Latino as an ethnic category. This table excludes Latinos from the racial categories and assigns them to a separate category. Hispanics/Latinos can be of any race.

Notable people 

 Earl P. Williams, Jr., U.S. flag historian (paleovexillologist) who discovered that U.S. Founding Father Francis Hopkinson designed a flag for the United States and a flag for the U.S. Navy, which became the prototype for the Stars and Stripes flag.

See also
Chapel Oaks-Cedar Heights, a single census area recorded during the 1970 Census.

References

Census-designated places in Prince George's County, Maryland
Census-designated places in Maryland